Against the Tide is a 1937 British drama film directed by Alex Bryce and starring Robert Cochran, Cathleen Nesbitt and Linden Travers. In the film, a Cornish fishing village is struck by a tragedy.

Cast
Margaret Leigh - 	Cathleen Nesbitt
Jim Leigh - 	Robert Cochran
Mary Poole - 	Linden Travers
Tom Jenkins - 	Jimmy Mageean
William Poole - 	Herbert Cameron
Bert Poole - 	Neil Carlton
Mrs Brewer - 	Dorothy Vernon

References

External links 

1937 films
1930s English-language films
1937 drama films
Films set in Cornwall
British drama films
British black-and-white films
1930s British films